The 17th District of the Iowa Senate is located in southern Iowa, and is currently composed of Polk County.

Current elected officials
Tony Bisignano is the senator currently representing the 17th District.

The area of the 17th District contains two Iowa House of Representatives districts:
The 33rd District (represented by Brian Meyer)
The 34th District (represented by Bruce Hunter)

The district is also located in Iowa's 3rd congressional district, which is represented by Cindy Axne.

Past senators
The district has previously been represented by:

Joseph J. Welsh, 1983–1994
Thomas Flynn, 1995–2002
Wally Horn, 2003–2012
Jack Hatch, 2013–2014
Tony Bisignano, 2015–present

See also
Iowa General Assembly
Iowa Senate

References

17